Sviatoslav Vsevolodovich  may refer to:
Sviatoslav III of Kiev, Prince of Chernihiv and Grand Prince of Kiev
Sviatoslav Vsevolodovich of Vladimir, Grand Prince of Vladimir